The following is a list of actors/actresses featured in the five series' of the United Kingdom TV series Footballers' Wives.

Series 1
Zöe Lucker as Tanya Turner (Series 1–5)
Gillian Taylforth as Jackie Pascoe-Webb (Series 1–5)
Alison Newman as Hazel Bailey (Series 1–4)
Gary Lucy as Kyle Pascoe (Series 1–3)
Susie Amy as Chardonnay Lane-Pascoe (Series 1–2) - a parody of Jordan
Cristian Solimeno as Jason Turner (Series 1–2)
John Forgeham as Frank Laslett (Series 1–3)
Julie Legrand as Jeanette Dunkley (Series 1–2, 4; crossed over to Footballers' Wives: Extra Time (recurring)
Daniel Schutzmann as Salvatore Biagi (Series 1–2)
Nathan Constance as Ian Walmsley (Series 1–2)
Katherine Monaghan as Donna Walmsley (Series 1–2)
Philip Bretherton as Stefan Hauser (Series 1–2) - a parody of Sven-Goran Eriksson
Micaiah Dring as Marie Minshull (Series 1)

Series 2
Peter Ash as Darius Fry (Series 2–5; crossed over to Footballers' Wives: Extra Time)
Jessica Brooks as Freddie Hauser (Series 2)

Series 3
Laila Rouass as Amber Gates (Series 3–5) - a parody of Victoria Beckham
Ben Price as Conrad Gates (Series 3–4) - a parody of David Beckham
Jesse Birdsall as Roger Webb (Series 3–5)
Sarah Barrand as Shannon Donnelly/Lawson (Series 3–5) - initially a parody of Coleen McLoughlin
Jamie Davis as Harley Lawson (Series 3–4)
Marcel McCalla as Noah Alexander (Series 3–4) - a parody of Justin Fashanu
Caroline Chikezie as Elaine Hardy (Series 3)

Series 4
Helen Latham as Lucy Milligan (Series 4–5)
Ben Richards as Bruno Milligan (Series 4–5)
Tom Swire as Sebastian Webb (Series 4; crossed over to Footballers' Wives: Extra Time)

Series 5
Craig Gallivan as Callum Watson (Series 5)
Lucia Giannecchini as Urszula Rosen (Series 5)
Phina Oruche as Liberty Baker (Series 5) - a parody of British model Naomi Campbell.
Angela Ridgeon as Trisha Watson (Series 5)
Jay Rodan as Paulo Bardosa (Series 5)
Chucky Venice as Tremaine Gidigbi (Series 5)
Nicholas Ball as Garry Ryan (Series 5; crossed over from Footballers' Wives: Extra Time)

Guest/recurring roles
Paula Wilcox as Marguerite Laslett (Series 1)
Lee-Anne Baker as Lara Bateman (Series 1–2)
Chad Shepherd as Ron Bateman (Series 1–4)
Julie Legrand as Janette Dunkley (Series 1–2, 4; crossed over to Footballers' Wives: Extra Time Series 2)
Camilla Beeput as Bethany Mortimer (Series 4)
Elaine Glover as Katie Jones (Series 4)
Joan Collins as Eva de Wolffe (Series 5)

Notes and references

Bibliography
Website reference for Footballers' Wives - Characters A - L and Footballers' Wives - Characters M - Z

Characters
Lists of fictional characters